Lee Norfolk (born 17 October 1975 in Dunedin) is a New Zealand footballer who represented his country at junior level, scoring one goal in a 3-0 win over Fiji in Napier in 1991.

He was the first New Zealander to play in the FA Premier League. After graduating from the Ipswich Town youth team, he made 4 appearances for the first team, the first of which was at home to Southampton in the FA Premier League on 25 February 1995.

Norfolk went back to his native New Zealand for a period with North Shore United before returning to England where he played for Sudbury, Needham, Halstead and Diss Town. Norfolk coaches Leiston FC who have won 3 championships in 3 years.

In the latter days of his playing career, Norfolk played for Leiston and had a second spell with Needham Market.

He has been an Ipswich town academy
Coach for several years. He was player coach for Leiston during their Steps 5 and 4 double promotion and became caretaker manager. He moved to Needham Market as first team coach where they won the championship and promotion to step 3 football. He became first team coach at Stowmarket then took up the role of assistant manager at step 4 club AFC Sudbury. He is currently first team coach at step 3 club Leiston FC who play in the southern premier central league.

References

External links

1975 births
Living people
British police officers
Expatriate footballers in England
Ipswich Town F.C. players
Cambridge City F.C. players
King's Lynn F.C. players
Woodbridge Town F.C. players
Bishop's Stortford F.C. players
Sudbury Wanderers F.C. players
A.F.C. Sudbury players
Halstead Town F.C. players
Needham Market F.C. players
Diss Town F.C. players
Stanway Rovers F.C. players
Felixstowe & Walton United F.C. players
Leiston F.C. players
New Zealand association footballers
New Zealand expatriate association footballers
Premier League players
Association footballers from Dunedin
Association football midfielders